Pleasant Shade is an unincorporated community in northern Smith County, Tennessee, United States. It has a post office, assigned zip code 37145. The community is centered along Tennessee State Route 80.

References

Unincorporated communities in Smith County, Tennessee
Unincorporated communities in Tennessee